Bruno is an unincorporated community in Marion County, Arkansas, United States. It is the location of five places listed on the National Register of Historic Places:

Aggie Hall, on County Road 9 	
Aggie Workshop, AR 235 Spur
Bruno School Building, Co. Rd. 9 	
Hirst-Mathew Hall, AR 235 Spur
Pea Ridge School Building, east of Co. Rd. 6, approximately 4 mi. south of Bruno

Education 
Public education is available from the Ozark Mountain School District that includes Bruno–Pyatt High School.

On July 1, 2004, the former Bruno-Pyatt School District consolidated into the Ozark Mountain School District.

References

Unincorporated communities in Marion County, Arkansas
Unincorporated communities in Arkansas